Set The Tone is the debut album by American-British soul singer Nate James.

Set The Tone may also refer to:

 Set the Tone (band), a Scottish electronic dance band 1982–1983
 "Set the Tone", track on 1993 album Pieces of Woo: The Other Side by Bernie Worrell